Jamunamarathur is in the top of Jawathu Hills.  It has a population of 9861 and altitude of 857m. It is the second highest place in Thiruvannamalai district. It became a 3rd grade town Panchayat in 1999 and second grade in 2008. 

Cities and towns in Tiruvannamalai district